This is the list of 350 cities and towns in Tunisia. In the list by governorate, capitals are shown in bold.

List of most-populated cities

List of municipalities by governorate

See also

List of cities by country
Governorates of Tunisia
List of metropolitan areas in Africa
List of largest cities in the Arab world

References

External links

Tunisia, List of cities in
Tunisia
Cities